Castagnède is the name of the following communes in France:

 Castagnède, Haute-Garonne, in the Haute-Garonne department
 Castagnède, Pyrénées-Atlantiques, in the Pyrénées-Atlantiques department